Elvin Mamishzada (born December 17, 1991) is an Azerbaijani boxer. At the 2012 Summer Olympics, he competed in the Men's flyweight, but was defeated in the first round by Nyambayaryn Tögstsogt of Mongolia. He also competed in the 2016 Summer Olympics but lost in the quarter-final round against Shakhobidin Zoirov from Uzbekistan, who would go on to win the tournament.

References

External links
 
 
 
 

Azerbaijani male boxers
Living people
Olympic boxers of Azerbaijan
Boxers at the 2012 Summer Olympics
Boxers at the 2016 Summer Olympics
Flyweight boxers
1991 births
People from Sumgait
AIBA World Boxing Championships medalists
Boxers at the 2015 European Games
European Games gold medalists for Azerbaijan
European Games medalists in boxing
20th-century Azerbaijani people
21st-century Azerbaijani people